is a 2017 anime television series based on Haruko Ichikawa's manga series of the same name. It is produced by the computer graphics (CG) animation studio Orange and directed and written by Takahiko Kyōgoku and Toshiya Ono, respectively. It follows the Lustrous – immortal humanoid life forms who are the embodiments of gemstones – who defend themselves against the Lunarians, who seek to harvest their bodies for decorations. Phosphophyllite is the youngest of the Lustrous, and is given the task to assemble a natural history since they are too brittle to fight.

Orange created the series with 3D animation as a base, a decision made partially due to the difficulty in depicting translucent gemstones using hand-drawn animation. Yoichi Nishikawa's concept art greatly influenced Kyōgoku's vision for the series, with several shots directly based on Nishikawa's art. While the manga is more ambiguous and subtle, the anime had to be clear on a single viewing, so Phos was given more close-up shots and repeated lines to give them a larger presence and more easily identifiable goals. As Kyōgoku was used to writing teenaged characters with clear motives and desires, he initially had problems with portraying Phos, but his image of the character solidified after hearing Tomoyo Kurosawa's performance as them.

The series was well-received by critics, frequently called among the best of the 2010s and a turning point for CG anime, and convincing skeptics that an action series could be well done outside of a 2D production. The writing was also positively received, with critics calling the characters and world likable and intriguing. It received several awards and nominations, namely for its visuals.

Premise

Land of the Lustrous is set in the far future, in a land inhabited by an immortal life form called the Lustrous, who are the embodiment of gemstones. The twenty-eight Lustrous are led by their teacher, Kongo, and fight to defend themselves against the Lunarians, who appear every few days, seeking to harvest the Lustrous' bodies for decorations. Phosphophyllite, nicknamed Phos, currently 300 years old, is the youngest of the Lustrous, and because of their brittleness is unable to fight. They feel useless, but are given the task to assemble a natural history by Kongo. While looking for information to include in the book, Phos meets the nightwatch, Cinnabar, who is poisonous and thus dangerous even to other Lustrous, and therefore lives in isolation. Finding this sad, Phos decides to find Cinnabar a better job.

Voice cast

Production
Land of the Lustrous was produced at the computer graphics (CG) animation studio Orange, and adapts Haruko Ichikawa's 2012 manga of the same name, covering little over its first four volumes. The series had Katsuhiro Takei and Kiyotaka Waki as production staff; and was directed by Takahiko Kyōgoku, with Toshiya Ono in charge of the series scripts, Eiji Inomoto serving as chief CG director, Kenji Fujita being director of photography, and with Daisuku Imai in charge of editing. Asako Nishida designed the characters, while Yōichi Nishikawa created the concept art, and Osamu Mikasa painted the color key art. The sound team included composer Yoshiaki Fujisawa and sound director Yukio Nagasaki. The opening theme, "Kyōmen no Nami", was performed by Yurika, and the ending theme, "Kirameku Hamabe", by Yuiko Ōhara.

The project started in 2015, while Kyōgoku was working on the anime series Gate, and was approached by Katsuhiro Takei from Toho to work on an adaptation of the Land of the Lustrous manga. Kyōgoku had always wanted to create a work based on CG animation with complementing 2D animation, rather than the more common use of a 2D base with complementing 3D, and both Kyōgoku and Takei thought that that style would fit Land of the Lustrous. Takei wanted Orange to work on the project from the start; despite trusting their abilities due to the staff's previous experience with action in the Rebuild of Evangelion films, Kyōgoku was initially worried about them handling the full production due to the low number of staff members, but the studio expanded from 50 to 100 staff members during the production.

Although voice recording for anime productions typically is done after the animation is finished, it was done prior to the CG creation for Land of the Lustrous, after the animatics were created. Kyōgoku was happy with the casting, saying that Kurosawa embraced her role and "became" Phos, acting out lines physically, and that the supporting cast helped support the spontaneity of Phos's character. Kyōgoku also specifically noted being happy with casting Nakata as Kongo, as they had worked together before and as he loved Nakata's acting. Describing Nakata as a gentleman, he thought he was perfectly suited for the role, and said that a too charming or sultry voice would not have worked for the character.

Storytelling
After reading the manga for the first time, Kyōgoku thought that it would be difficult to surpass the manga by simply copying what was shown in each panel: according to him, the appeal of the manga was its ambiguity and subtlety, saying that there is more room for subtle portrayal in a manga, since the reader can re-read it, whereas an anime aired on television needs to be clearer on a single viewing. Because of this, they made the protagonist clearer by giving Phos more close-up shots and having them repeat certain important lines, leading to them appearing to have a larger presence in the story and have more easily identifiable goals. Ono helped in this by breaking down difficult portions of the manga's story into scenes.

Kyōgoku and Ichikawa discussed the story development, and Kyōgoku was asked to leave it uncertain whether Phos's changes during the story are good or not, and to portray the change as starting with their meeting with Cinnabar, as Ichikawa saw those two elements as the foundation of Land of the Lustrous. She partook in story development meetings, and discussed how to achieve the right balance between exploring subjects in detail and prompting questions, such as what the true nature of the Lunarians is, due to how not everything could have been explained in twelve episodes. Although she told Kyōgoku about events in not yet published manga chapters, she asked him to avoid incorporating elements from future chapters; he saw his role as consisting of him organizing the manga material, and was happy with how much of the manga's story they were able to adapt, with the anime covering all parts he wanted to include.

Initially, Kyōgoku had some issues with how to portray Phos, as he was used to working with teenaged characters with obvious desires and motives, whereas Phos lacks resolve and is resigned to their frustration due to having spent 300 years doing nothing, not being too serious about their emotions even when angry. His image of Phos solidified after hearing Kurosawa's performance, saying that her acting had the right level of ambiguity for the character.

Visuals

The decision to create the series using CG came in part from how the beauty of gemstones was seen as part of the series' appeal, and how it would have been difficult to depict their translucency using hand-drawn animation, whereas CG enabled this; Kyōgoku had from the beginning envisioned the characters as figures with clear, moving parts. As Land of the Lustrous was Orange's first anime project as the main production studio, they spent a lot of time adjusting to it from the types of CG productions they were used to, balancing how detailed the CG work should be and figuring out how to achieve Kyōgoku's vision for the visual treatment of the characters. While Kyōgoku was happy with the final versions of the episodes, he said that it took much longer to create than had the series been created using 2D animation, saying that the first storyboards were not finished until June 2016 and that the first produced cuts took months to create, although it started to go more smoothly once the first were finished.
 
Nishikawa became involved in the production as Waki nominated him for the role as concept artist. Although Nishikawa had not been familiar with the source material previously, his wife was a fan of the manga, and he thought that he could be able to express himself through the background artwork due to how the manga does not use a lot of backgrounds. His concepts greatly influenced Kyōgoku's vision for what he wanted to accomplish with the series, with Kyōgoku specifically citing a piece showing a cel-shaded Phos with photo-realistic hair, behind CG grass, as influential. Many shots featured in the show were directly based on Nishikawa's pieces, including the framing and the shading used. He used triadic color schemes for his pieces, noting that the large amount of open spaces in the anime meant that the visuals would look flat if the color work was done incorrectly.

As Kyōgoku had worked with Nishida in the past, and she was a fan of the Land of the Lustrous manga, it was an easy decision to appoint her as the character designer. She designed a lot of reference artwork for the character proportions and facial expressions, creating a wide range of expressions despite Kyōgoku being unspecific in the instructions; this helped the production a lot, as the comedic sequences demanded a lot of different expressions and exaggerated faces. Translating the 2D character designs into 3D models was a very simple process due to how the characters all have about the same bodily proportions, allowing the artists to mostly focus on the characters' faces and hair.

Due to Orange's technical experience there were not a lot of technical problems with the production, although there were sometimes difficulties in reproducing the intended colors from the concept art in the 3D renderings. Cinnabar was also a difficult character to animate due to their subtle character acting and their finely detailed hair, and how they are surrounded by mercury. Orange had a lot of freedom in creating the action sequences, as Kyōgoku gave mostly vague directions for them, such as what general camera movement to use. To guide the 3D animation, 2D "guide animation" was produced; one animator working on these was Norio Matsumoto, known for his work on action sequences in the Naruto anime series.

Release
Land of the Lustrous was announced in the magazine Monthly Afternoon in May 2017, and aired for twelve episodes on Japanese television on AT-X, Tokyo MX, BS11 and MBS from October 7 to December 23, 2017. Sentai Filmworks licensed the series and simulcast it through Amazon's Anime Strike platform in the United States; following the cancellation of Anime Strike in January 2018, it was transferred to the Amazon Prime Video service. The series was also simulcast through Hidive in the United Kingdom, Ireland, South Africa, Oceania, and Central and South America.

The series was released across six DVD and Blu-ray sets by Toho in Japan starting on December 22, 2017; the Japanese home video packaging was designed by the book design artist Tomoko Yamada as her first anime work, who modeled the packaging after jewelry boxes. Sentai Filmworks released the series on Blu-ray in a Steelbook case in North America on January 22, 2019. MVM Films acquired the series for distribution in the United Kingdom, with a release on Blu-ray on April 29, 2019. Sentai Filmworks produced English and Latin American Spanish dubs.

For the English release of the anime, series translator Deven Neel was instructed by the manga's creator, Haruko Ichikawa, to use gender-neutral pronouns for the characters, as Ichikawa wanted to portray them as genderless: the Japanese script uses a pronoun similar to "he", although noted by Neel as being more ambiguous, while the English translation uses singular "they".

The series' opening and ending themes were released separately on December 6, 2017 on CD, and the album Land of the Lustrous Sound Track Complete was released on January 17, 2018. An art exhibit featuring the production art from the series was held in Yūrakuchō, Tokyo from January 19 to February 25, 2018; it was originally intended to run until February 18, but was extended due to the popularity of it. The production art was also collected in the art book Houseki no Kuni Concept Arts, which was released on February 28, 2018. Other merchandise based on the show has also been released, including plush toys, pins, bags and mugs.

Episode list

Reception

Critical reception
Land of the Lustrous was positively received by critics, and called among the best anime of the season and of the decade, and one of the most inventive and fresh anime in years. The story and characters were praised by critics, who called them unique and relatable, with engrossing, likable characters and an intriguing world, and succeeding both at internal and external struggles.

Michelle Villanueva of Syfy stated that the gems are portrayed as non-binary, noting the relationship between Phosphophyllite "Phos" and Cinnabar, with Rutile having deep feelings for Padparadscha, saying that both have feelings for each other. She added that while the series isn't perfect in terms of "queer representation" as the gems are thin-limbed and shiny, with all the gems voiced by "cis female actors, hopefully that it is a "daring stepping stone on the road to queer representation," which will lead to more "queer-themed mainstream anime and manga." Villanueva noted this because when the anime was released in English, series translator Deven Neel was instructed by the manga's creator, Haruko Ichikawa, to use gender-neutral pronouns for the characters, as Ichikawa wanted to portray them as genderless: the Japanese script uses a pronoun similar to "he", although noted by Neel as being more ambiguous, while the English translation uses singular "they".

The series was well received for its visuals and use of CG; although some critics were initially unsure about its look, it was later praised as a turning point for CG anime and something even skeptics of CG anime would enjoy, with Otaku USA calling it Orange's best visual work and one of the best-looking TV anime in recent memory. The animation itself was also well received, with character posing, timing and acting described as unusually good for CG anime, particularly Phos's animation in combination with Kurosawa's voice performance. Anime News Network and the Japanese publication Animate Times enjoyed the prominent action sequences in the series, and Otaku USA liked how those sequences took advantage of the CG production, making use of dynamic camerawork that would not have been as feasible in a fully 2D production. They also liked the implementation of supplementary 2D elements, such as facial animations and close up, and how they were integrated into the larger 3D production. The art direction was similarly well received, and was described as a good conversion of both the original manga's atmosphere and of Nishikawa's concept art. Otaku USA liked the Lustrous' character designs, but particularly liked how the Lunarians were designed and arranged like serene, divine and inscrutable Buddhist processions, which helped in making them menacing.

Accolades
The series won VFX-Japan Awards 2018 "Excellence" and "Best" awards in the "Television Anime CG" category, and was nominated for the 2017 CG World Awards in the "Best Work in CG Animation" category; CG World also nominated Orange for the "Grand Prix" category, for their work on action sequences, facial expressions and character presentation within Land of the Lustrous. The series won the 2nd Crunchyroll Anime Awards in the "Best CGI" category in 2017, and was nominated for their "Anime of the Year", "Best Action", "Best Animation" and "Best Score" categories; the ending theme "Kirameku Hamabe" was also nominated for their "Best Ending" category. The series won the 4th Anime Trending Awards in the "Best in Sceneries and Visuals" category, and was nominated for their "Best in Adaptation", "Best in Soundtrack", "Best in Character Design", "Best in Animation Effects and Sequence", "Action or Adventure Anime of the Year" and "Fantasy or Magical Anime of the Year" categories.

Polygon named the series as one of the best anime of the 2010s, and Crunchyroll listed it in their "Top 100 best anime of the 2010s". IGN also listed the series among the best anime series of the 2010s. Lauren Orsini of Forbes included Land of the Lustrous on her list of the best anime of the decade. The series was also included in multiple Anime News Network writers' individual lists of the best anime of the season, and in the publication's 2018 feature about "visually striking anime productions".

Sales
The first two Japanese DVD volumes sold around 900 copies each, ranking 16th and 5th on the weekly Japanese DVD charts, the third sold around 800 copies, ranking 8th, and the fourth and fifth sold around 700, ranking 6th and 9th. The first five Japanese Blu-ray volumes all sold around 5,000 copies each, ranking 6th, 1st, 1st, 2nd and 2nd on the Blu-ray charts.

Notes

References

External links
  
 
 

2017 anime television series debuts
Action anime and manga
Anime series based on manga
Anime Strike
AT-X (TV network) original programming
Crunchyroll Anime Awards winners
Fantasy anime and manga
Japanese computer-animated television series
Orange (animation studio)
Sentai Filmworks
Toho Animation